The Social Democratic Alliance is a social democratic, and pro-European political party in Iceland.

The Social Democratic Alliance was founded in 2000 after a merger of four centre-left political parties (the National Awakening, the People's Alliance, the Social Democratic Party and the Women's List) following a joint run by all parties in the 1999 Icelandic parliamentary election. The vision of the party was to unite the left-wing of Icelandic politics, which had been fractured since the 1930 split of the Social Democratic Party, and present a united bloc to oppose the ruling Independence Party.

In the snap 2009 Icelandic parliamentary election called in the aftermath of the Icelandic financial crisis, the Social Democratic Alliance under the leadership of Jóhanna Sigurðardóttir emerged as the largest party and formed a coalition government with the Left-Green Movement, which was the country's first majority left-wing government. She was the country’s first female prime minister and the world’s first openly gay head of government.

The party lost substantial support in the 2013 Icelandic parliamentary election, becoming the third largest in Alþingi and nearly losing all its representatives at the 2016 Icelandic parliamentary election, where it polled 5.7%. In the 2017 Icelandic parliamentary election the party won 7 seats with 12.1% of the vote.

In 2014 it became the largest party in the Reykjavík City Council, and party member Dagur B. Eggertsson became mayor. As of 2018 it is the second largest party in the City Council after the Independence Party but remains in a majority coalition with Dagur as mayor.

History 
The Social Democratic Alliance was born in the run-up to the 1999 Icelandic parliamentary election as a political alliance of the four left-wing political parties that had existed in Iceland up till then, namely the National Awakening, the People's Alliance, the Social Democratic Party and the Women's List.

The parties then formally merged in May 2000 under the name The Alliance (Samfylkingin). The merger was a deliberate attempt to unify the entire Icelandic centre-left into one political party capable of countering the centre-right Independence Party. However, the initial attempt failed as a group of Althing representatives rejected the new party's platform, which was inspired by that of UK Prime Minister Tony Blair's centrist New Labour, and broke away before the merger to found the Left-Green Movement, a party based on more traditional democratic socialist values as well as Euroscepticism and green politics. The Icelandic Movement – Living Country merged into the party in March 2009.

In February 2013, the official name of the party was changed to The Alliance – Social Democratic Party of Iceland.

The chair of the party is Logi Már Einarsson, who was elected as vice-chairman in June 2016. Oddný Guðbjörg Harðardóttir was elected as chair of the party to succeed Árni Páll Árnason in June 2016, but he resigned after the results the 2016 Icelandic parliamentary election. The youth wing of the Social Democratic Alliance is the Social Democratic Youth.

Electoral results

Leadership

Parliamentary party

References 

https://www.althingi.is/english/members-of-parliament/political-parties/
https://www.britannica.com/biography/Johanna-Sigurdardottir#ref1048547
https://www.visir.is/g/20202034266d/heida-bjorg-hilmis-dottir-endur-kjorin-vara-for-madur-sam-fylkingarinnar (in Icelandic)
https://www.visir.is/g/20202034262d

External links 
 Official website (in Icelandic)

 https://grapevine.is/mag/articles/2013/04/08/samfylkingin-the-social-democratic-alliance-interviewed/
 https://www.britannica.com/biography/Johanna-Sigurdardottir#ref1048547
 https://icelandmonitor.mbl.is/news/politics_and_society/2017/10/28/iceland_2017_elections_government_parties_lose_majo/

 
Social democratic parties in Europe
Pro-European political parties in Iceland
[]Category:Centre-left parties in Europe]]